Louis Freedman  (1917–1998) was a British businessman and racehorse owner and breeder. He was chairman of Land Securities from 1957 to 1977 and in horse racing he was the owner and breeder of a number of top-class racehorses, most notably the 1987 Epsom Derby and St Leger Stakes winner Reference Point.

Freedman was a member of the Race Relations Board from 1968 to 1977 and was made a CBE for services to race relations. He was also a member of the Jockey Club and president of the Racehorse Owners Association in 1973-74.

References 

1917 births
1998 deaths
British racehorse owners and breeders
20th-century British businesspeople
People educated at University College School
Commanders of the Order of the British Empire
Owners of Epsom Derby winners